is a Japanese manga series written and illustrated by Shotaro Ishinomori. It was adapted into a 23-episode anime television series which was produced by Gakken and Fuji Television, co-produced by Nihon Ad Systems, and animated by Studio Pierrot, broadcasting on Fuji TV from April 9 to September 28, 1984. The series revolves around an alien duck named Chikkun and his advisor Takkun, trying to stop an alien mad scientist from invading Earth.

Characters
  The young prince of Star R, who has gone to Earth in an attempt to recover the Waruchin. In the manga, he goes to Earth just to explore the planet. He is in the Star R equivalent of elementary school, and is very curious and childish sometimes. While he is set to marry Princess Leah when he grows up, he has a crush on Miko. Voice: Masako Sugaya
  Chikkun's royal advisor, a robotic hat that can pull any item out of himself, like Doraemon. He is very sharp-eyed and a wise scientist, trying to tutor Chikkun, and Chikkun holds high regards for him. Voice: Kaneta Kimotsuki
  A thirteen-year-old girl who first met Chikkun, and in the anime, is the leader of the Kyunkyuns. She is friendly and very popular in her class, but she isn't afraid of getting serious or tough when in danger. In the manga, she is younger, and has brown hair in a bob and a headband, but in the anime she has orange hair in curls and a foxtail headband. Voice: Miina Tominaga
  Chikkun's royal bodyguard on Star R. He is an enormous, strong robot who can transform into a rocket. Despite his size and strength, he is easygoing and meek with a soft voice. Voice: Naoki Tatsuta
  The ambitious, self-proclaimed "Last Great Villain of Star R", who stole the Waruchin with the intent to control planet Earth. Dr. Bell has a bell hanging from the back of his hood, which rings whenever he moves and is his namesake. He has a short temper, usually getting irritated or emotional very easily. He is in love with the Kyunkyuns, particularly with Miko. In the anime, he sometimes ends his sentences with "beru" (bell). Voice: Shigeru Chiba
  Dr. Bell's faithful assistant, a robotic spider with great mechanical skill. He is usually quite airheaded and dense, but has a lot of faith in Dr. Bell. On Star R, he has a wife and five children. In the manga, he is painted black, but is red in the anime and says "giji" at the end of his sentences. Voice: Kenichi Ogata

  Miko's parents, both of whom are both kindhearted and let Chikkun stay with them. Akira is an architect, shy but protective of his family, and Futsuko is beautiful and runs the household. Voice: Rokurō Naya and Fumi Hirano
  Miko's four friends who help Chikkun, all of whom appear in the anime only.
 : The oldest of the group, Maki is very athletic and tomboyish, even referring to herself with "ore" in Japanese. She usually provides stability for the group. Voice: Chika Sakamoto
 : A mechanic in training, and the group's science enthusiast. She can be awkward and easily gets crushes on boys. Voice: Naoko Matsui
 : A very relaxed, airheaded girl. She wears blue eye shadow and usually keeps her sleeves over her hands. Voice: Yuuko Matsutani
 : The youngest and most timid member of the group. While she can be very sweet, she is a crybaby, which sometimes gets her into trouble. Voice: Chie Kōjiro
  Chikkun's rival, a young millionaire from Star R. Andre is a mockingbird who is always well-dressed and accompanied by an army of crow men. It is implied he visited earth early in the series, disguised as a pretty human boy. Voice: Masako Nozawa
  Chikkun's fiancée, from an assigned marriage on Star R. The Waruchin was in her family's collection, and she often sends Chikkun messages of encouragement in his struggle to get it back. Usually, she acts very dainty and refined, but has a short temper. Her name is an intentional play on Princess Leia. Voice: Matsumi Ōshiro

  Chikkun's spaceship, shaped like an upside-down bowl of ramen. It has jet boosters on the bottom that look like eggs. Its name is a combination of "ramen" and "U.F.O."
  Dr. Bell's spaceship, which can turn into a submarine and is equipped with the Namazukko Shuttle, a miniature, removable ship. The whole ship is shaped like a bright red catfish. Its name is a combination of "nazuma" (catfish) and "marine."
  A digital book which has had all of the evil on Star R confined to it, according to Chikkun's father, the King. The book can be opened like a laptop computer, is password-locked, and is capable of generating anything its operator wants through holograms and scientific formulas.  Voice: Junpei Takiguchi

Media

Manga 
Briefly titled Chikkun's Grand Adventures, the story revolves around a girl named Miko meeting Chikkun, who crash-landed near her house. Dr. Bell and Giji-Giji crashed on Earth not too far away and set about trying to enslave the planet, but are easily deterred by Chikkun and Takkun. The manga ran in several different magazines from 1982 to 1984, but Ishinomori ended the series as soon as the anime was put in progress.

Anime 
Chikkun, Prince of Planet R, goes to Earth with his advisor and bodyguard robot in search of the Waruchin Encyclopedia. The book, when connected to a computer system, is capable of making anything possible. Chikkun lands on earth and falls in love with a girl named Miko, who is the leader of a group of girls called the Kyunkyuns, who befriend him immediately. At the same time, the original thieves of the Waruchin, Dr. Bell and his assistant Giji-Giji, are on Earth and attempting to take over the planet with the Waruchin. Miko, her family, and the Kyunkyuns join together to repeatedly stop Dr. Bell.

Episodes

References

External links
 Chikkun Takkun
 Chikkun Takkun 
 

1982 manga
1984 anime television series debuts
Fuji TV original programming
Manga series
Pierrot (company)
Shotaro Ishinomori
Animated television series about ducks